The  New Orleans VooDoo season was the ninth and final season and for the franchise in the Arena Football League (AFL). The team was coached by Dean Cokinos and played their home games at the Smoothie King Center. The team finished the regular season dead last in the league at 3–14-1, with one game cancelled and regarded officially as a tie, and failed to qualify for the playoffs for a third straight season. Following the season, the AFL, which had operated the team as owners since July 15, announced that the VooDoo would cease operations effective immediately.

Standings

Schedule

Regular season
The 2015 regular season schedule was released on December 19, 2014.

Final roster

References

New Orleans VooDoo
New Orleans VooDoo seasons
New Orleans VooDoo
2010s in New Orleans